Cellini is an Italian surname. Notable people with the surname include:

 Benvenuto Cellini (1500–1571), Italian goldsmith, painter, sculptor, soldier and musician
 Dino Cellini (1914–1978), Italian-American mobster
 Julie Cellini (21st century), American journalist
 Karen Cellini (born 1958), American actress
 Marco Cellini (born 1981), Italian footballer
 Renato Cellini (1912–1967), Italian opera conductor
 Vince Cellini (born 1959), American sports announcer

Italian-language surnames